Ardmore is a small townland in Mullingar in County Westmeath, Ireland. A section of the N52 road passes through the area, and the Royal Canal passes to the southeast of the townland. No population was recorded for the townland in the 2011 census.

References 

Townlands of County Westmeath